Dedua is a Papuan language spoken in Morobe Province, Papua New Guinea. Dialects are Dzeigoc and Fanic.

Phonology

Vowels (orthographic)

Consonants (orthographic)

References

Languages of Morobe Province
Huon languages